Megachile dulciana is a species of bee in the family Megachilidae. It was described by Mitchell in 1934.

References

Dulciana
Insects described in 1934